Jamoytiiformes is an extinct order of prehistoric jawless fish in the superclass Anaspidomorphi.

Taxonomy
Taxonomy is based on Mikko's Phylogeny Archive

 Family †Achanarellidae Newman 2002
 Genus †Achanarella Newman 2002 [Achanarella Saxon 1978 nomen nudum]
 †Achanarella trewini Newman 2002 
 Family †Jamoytiidae White 1946
 Genus †Conopiscius Briggs & Clarkson 1987
 †Conopiscius clarki Briggs & Clarkson 1987
 Genus †Jamoytius White 1946
 †Jamoytius kerwoodi White 1946

References 

 A New Interpretation of Jamoytius Kerwoodi White. Alexander Ritchie, Nature, volume 188, pages 647–649 (19 November 1960),

External links 

 
Prehistoric jawless fish orders